The Presbyterian Church in Korea (HapDongYeSun) is a Reformed Presbyterian denomination in South Korea and adheres to the Apostles Creed and Westminster Confession. In 2004 it had 2,814 members and 31 congregations served by 71 pastors. It has Presbyterian church government.

References 

Presbyterian denominations in South Korea
Presbyterian denominations in Asia